Hallelujah Chicken Run Band was a Zimbabwean band formed in Mhangura in the 1970s. The band featured Robson Boora (sax), Joshua Hlomayi Dube (guitar), Wilson Jubane (guitar), Patrick Kabanda (drums), Daram Karanga (trumpet), Thomas Mapfumo (vocals),  Abdulah Musa (guitar), and Robert Nekati (bass). The band was an early pioneer of a style of music called chimurenga, from the Shona word for “struggle.”

History 
The band was founded by trumpet player Daram Katanga in order to perform for workers at Mangura copper mine. They initially started playing the more common Afro-Rock styles of the period, but gained an increased following when they shifted their sound to include electric arrangements with traditional Shona music.

In 1974 they won a national music competition organized by the South African label Teal that would solidify their growing popularity.

The sound they pioneered would eventually be called Chimurenga and was adopted by other bands of the 70s and 80s. Singer Thomas Mapfumo had a successful music career in the 80s and would go on to bring Chimurenga around the world.

Discography

Singles & EPs
 Alikulila / Mazhlamini (7") (1974, Afro Soul)
 Muroridodo / Hodi (7") (1974, Afro Soul)
 Ngoma Yarira / Murembo (7") (1974, Afro Soul)
 Shumba Inobva Mu Gomo / Amalume (7")	(1977, Shungu)
 Manhanga / Chinyi Chatakatadza (7") (1980, Star Black)
 Mukadzi Wangu Ndomuda / Sekai (7") (Afro Pop)
 Tinokumbira Kuziva / Ngatiende Kumusha (7") (Afro Pop)		
 Chakanyuka / Sara Anochema (7") (Shungu)	
 Midzimu Yedu / Tave Muzimbabwe (7")

Compilations
 Take One (2006, Analog Africa)

See also
Afropop
Chimurenga
Music of Zimbabwe
Chimurenga music

References

Zimbabwean musicians
Shona people